Trist may refer to:
David Trist (born 1947), New Zealand cricketer
Eric Trist (1909–1993), British scientist
Margaret Trist (1914–1986), Australian short story writer and novelist
Nicholas Trist (1800–1874), American diplomat
Browse Trist (1698?–1777), English MP